Ídolos Brazil 3 (known as Ídolos 2008) was the third season of Brazilian reality interactive talent show Ídolos (and first aired on Rede Record), which premiered August 19, 2008 with the season finale airing on December 17, 2008.

Rodrigo Faro was the host and the judging panel was reduced from 4 (in seasons 1 and 2) to 3 and consisted of Luís Calainho, a music and entertainment businessman, Paula Lima, a soul singer/songwriter and Marco Camargo, a Latin Grammy Award winning music producer.

Rafael Barreto won the competition with Rafael Bernardo as the first runner-up and Maria Christina finishing third.

Early Process

Regional Auditions 
Auditions were held in the following cities:

Theater Round

Groups 
The first day of Theater Week featured the eighty-nine contestants from the auditions round. Divided into groups, each contestant should go on stage and sing a song a capella for the judges until they stopped them. Seventy contestants advanced.

Duets 
The next round required the contestants to split up in pairs and perform. Forty-five advanced to the final round of Theater requiring a solo performance.

Solos 
Forty-five made it to the final round, which required the contestants singing solo with the option of playing an instrument. In the end, the judges take the contestants in groups of five and tell them if they made the final thirty.

Semi-finals 
The thirty semifinalists were randomly split into different groups. Each contestant would then sing in their respective group's night. There were three separate groups and the top three contestants from each group made it to the finals.

Wild Card 
Six contestants who failed to make it to the finals were invited back to perform for another chance at a spot in the finals. Only one wildcard contestant (Nanda Garcia) was chosen by the public vote.

Finals

Finalists

Elimination chart

References

External links 
 Ídolos Brazil website

Ídolos (Brazilian TV series)
2008 Brazilian television seasons